Rebecca Copley is an American soprano opera singer. Copley is a resident of Lindsborg, Kansas, a Swedish arts community and the home of Bethany College, where she received her training.

She has performed with many American orchestras and companies, including Musica Sacra, the New York City Opera, the New Jersey Symphony Orchestra and the Metropolitan Opera.

References

External links
 Personal site

Year of birth missing (living people)
Living people
American people of Swedish descent
American operatic sopranos
21st-century American women